Allen Wayne Lewellen (February 16, 1944 – March 27, 2009) was an American film distribution executive and producer for Paramount Pictures.

A native Texan, Lewellen began his career in 1965, aged 21, at Warner Bros.' Dallas branch. He began heading the distribution unit for the studio's motion picture group in 1986 and added foreign distribution to his duties in 1993.

During his tenure, he was responsible for distributing such films as Forrest Gump, Titanic, Top Gun, Fatal Attraction, Beverly Hills Cop and the Star Trek film series.  Lewellen left the studio at the end of 2005, after reportedly having been forced out by film executive Brad Grey.

Death
Lewellen died on March 27, 2009, aged 65, following a short battle with cancer at his home in Westlake Village, California. He was survived by his wife, Rosemary Lewellen; three sons, six grandchildren, one brother (Jesse Lewellyn) and two sisters (Addie Ruth Lewellen-Poteet, Betty Lewellen-Hill).

References

External links
 Tribute to Wayne Lewellen
 Hollywood Reporter
 Variety obit

1944 births
2009 deaths
Film producers from California
American people of Welsh descent
Film distributors (people)
Deaths from cancer in California
People from Dallas
People from Greater Los Angeles
People from Westlake Village, California
Place of birth missing
Film producers from Texas